OTA or ota may stand for:

Art, entertainment, and media
 Off the Air, an Adult Swim television series
 Otakon, an annual anime convention in Baltimore, Maryland

Electronics, science, and technology
 Ochratoxin A (also termed OTA), a mycotoxin
 Operational transconductance amplifier, a kind of operational amplifier
 Optical tube assembly, the tubular optical train of a telescope as referred by astronomers
 Over-the-air, another word for wireless communication
 Over-the-air programming, a method of reprogramming smart phones and other mobile devices
 OTA bitmap, a data format developed by Nokia for sending images via SMS
 Over-the-air television (or terrestrial television), the traditional method of television broadcast signal delivery
 Over-the-air performance testing, evaluation of the performance of a radio including the impact of its radiation pattern and its interaction with device circuitry.

Law and government
 Ontario Temperance Act, 1916 Canadian law prohibiting the manufacture, transportation and sale of alcohol and alcoholic beverages

Language
 'ota', the ISO 639 code for the Ottoman Turkish language

Organizations
 New South Wales Operating Theatre Association, an Australian non-profit perioperative nursing professional association
 Officers Training Academy, an Indian military academy in Chennai
 Office of Technology Assessment, a United States Congress agency that operated from 1972 to 1995
 Oklahoma Turnpike Authority, organization that operates turnpikes within the state of Oklahoma
 OpenTravel Alliance and the OpenTravel XML data format for the travel industry
 Orascom Telecom Algeria, another name for Djezzy GSM (a branch of Orascom group)
 Organic Trade Association, a North American association that focuses on the organic business community
 Orthodontic Technicians Association, the professional body that represents orthodontic technicians based in the United Kingdom.
 Oxford Text Archive, an archive of electronic texts and other literary and language resources at the University of Oxford
 OTA Broadcasting LLC, unit of Michael Dell's investment company MSD Capital purchasing small television stations potentially for resale of licenses via FCC auction.
 Online travel agency, a travel website that specializes in offering online planning sources and booking capabilities

Professions
 Occupational therapy assistant

Sports
 Organized Team Activities, used to describe preseason training sessions during National Football League training camp

See also
Ohta (disambiguation)
Okhta (disambiguation)
Over-the-air (disambiguation)